Frederick William Short was a South African cyclist. He competed in the individual road race event at the 1928 Summer Olympics.

References

External links
 

Year of birth missing
Possibly living people
South African male cyclists
Olympic cyclists of South Africa
Cyclists at the 1928 Summer Olympics
Place of birth missing